Blackburn Island, also known locally as Rabbit Island, is a small uninhabited island in the lagoon of Lord Howe Island in the Tasman Sea. It has an area of 2.4 ha, a maximum height of 32 m and lies some 700 m off the west coast of Lord Howe within the waters of the Lord Howe Island Marine Park. It is vegetated mainly with grasses, and is largely covered with the breeding burrows of wedge-tailed shearwaters. It is easily accessible by kayak from Lord Howe.

References

 

Islands of New South Wales
Geography of Lord Howe Island
Seabird colonies